St Edmund's Church is a small Gothic Revival Anglican church located in Coolkelure, County Cork, Ireland. It was completed in 1865. It is dedicated to Edmund the Martyr. It is part of Fanlobbus Union of Parishes in the Diocese of Cork, Cloyne, and Ross.

History 
Built in 1865, St Edmund's church replaced a school building which had been licensed for worship since 1843. The construction of St Edmund's was supported by Bishop John Gregg and a local landowner, Colonel E.A. Shuldham, each of which contributed IR£500 to the church's construction.

Cliff Jeffers has served as rector to the parish since 2014.

Architecture 
The church was designed by Cork architect Henry Hill. The building features a three-bay nave.

References

Notes

Sources 

 

Architecture in Ireland
Churches in the Diocese of Cork, Cloyne and Ross
19th-century Church of Ireland church buildings
Gothic Revival church buildings in the Republic of Ireland
19th-century churches in the Republic of Ireland